is the debut single of Perfume. This single was sold exclusively in the hometown of the group, Hiroshima by Momiji Label. The single was produced and arranged by Bakufu Slump’s Pappara Kawai, with lyrics by Tanaka Hanano. Considered a rare collector's item, this single was originally ¥500 (US$), but now is generally traded for upwards of ¥40,000, or US$.

Background 
"OMAJINAI★Perori" is the first single released by Perfume (then ぱふゅ→む). It was released as a regular CD only edition. The song title translates roughly to "Gulping Down a Good Luck Charm" and describes the feelings and sentiments of young girls on the first day of school. The lyrics of the pre-chorus describe writing the  Japanese kanji character for "person" (人, hito) three times in the palm of one's hand and licking it up, a common aspect of Japanese folklore used to prevent nervousness and bring about incoming dominance over others (primarily with children).

Track listing

External links 
 Music video on Clipland

2002 singles
Perfume (Japanese band) songs

ja:OMAJINAI★ペロリ